Rayne Dakota Prescott (born July 29, 1993) is an American football quarterback for the Dallas Cowboys of the National Football League (NFL). He played college football at Mississippi State, where he twice received first-team All-SEC honors, and was selected by the Cowboys in the fourth round of the 2016 NFL Draft.

Intended to serve as a backup in his rookie season, Prescott became the Cowboys' starting quarterback after starter Tony Romo was injured in the preseason. He went on to lead the Cowboys to the top seed of the National Football Conference (NFC) and set several rookie quarterback records, earning him Offensive Rookie of the Year. Prescott has since led the Cowboys to two additional division titles and made two Pro Bowl appearances. In 2022, he won the Walter Payton NFL Man of the Year award.

Early years
Dak is the youngest of Nathaniel and Peggy Prescott's three children. While she worked as a manager of a truck stop, Prescott attended Haughton High School in Haughton, Louisiana, where he played football for the Buccaneers. As a senior, he completed 159 of 258 passes for 2,860 yards and 39 touchdowns. He also rushed for 951 yards on 90 attempts with 17 touchdowns, and led Haughton to become 2010 District 1-AAAA Champions. Peggy had colon cancer and died on November 3, 2013. A three-star recruit, Prescott accepted a scholarship from Mississippi State over offers from Louisiana Tech, LSU, Memphis, Nicholls State, North Texas, and TCU.

College career
Prescott was redshirted as a true freshman with Mississippi State in 2011. As a backup to Tyler Russell in 2012, he played in 12 games, completing 18 of 29 passes for 194 yards with four touchdowns and no interceptions. He also scored four rushing touchdowns, with 110 yards on 32 carries.

Prescott began as the backup to Russell again in the 2013 season, but took over as the starter when Russell suffered a concussion. He played in 11 games, completing 156 of 267 passes for 1,940 yards with 10 touchdowns and seven interceptions. He also ran for 829 yards on 134 carries with 13 touchdowns. He was the MVP of the 2013 Liberty Bowl after leading the Bulldogs to a 44–7 win over the Rice Owls. His 2013 season performance ranks seventh in passing yards (1,940), tied for fifth in rushing touchdowns (13), and fourth in total yards (2,769) and total touchdowns (23). Following the season, he was named to the 2013 SEC Fall Academic Honor Roll.

In his first season as a full-time starter in 2014, Prescott led the Bulldogs to a 10–2 regular season record, its first #1 ranking in program history, and led them to the Orange Bowl. During the 2014 season, Prescott broke 10 school records including: single season passing yards (3,449), total yards of total offense (4,435), passing touchdowns (27), and total touchdowns (41). Additionally his 14 rushing touchdowns is tied for fourth in school history. Prescott also garnered several accolades throughout and following the season. He was named the Manning Award Player of the Week five times (vs. UAB, at LSU, vs. Texas A&M, vs. Auburn, vs. Vanderbilt); the 2014 SEC Offensive Player of the Week three times (at LSU, vs. Auburn, vs. Vanderbilt); the Athlon Sports, Davey O'Brien, Maxwell Award Player of the Week twice each (at LSU, vs. A&M); and the 24/7 Sports National Offensive Player of Week (at LSU). He was named a 2014 Honorable Mention All-American by SI.com; named to the 2014 First-team All-SEC team by the AP, Coaches, and ESPN.com; and on the 2014 SEC Fall Academic Honor Roll. He won the Conerly Trophy and was a finalist for the Maxwell Award, the Davey O'Brien Award, the Johnny Unitas Golden Arm award, and the Manning Award. He also finished eighth in the 2014 Heisman Trophy voting and received two first-place votes.

Prior to the 2015 season, he was named a 2015 National Player of the Year Candidate, was selected to two Preseason All-American teams (Athlon Sports and Phil Steele), and was chosen First-team Preseason All-SEC by the media. During the 2015 season, he became the fourth player in FBS history to pass for 60 touchdowns and rush for 40 touchdowns in a career, joining Dan LeFevour of Central Michigan, Tim Tebow of Florida, and Colin Kaepernick of Nevada. His 2,411 rushing yards places him third in all-time rushing yards by a quarterback in SEC history behind Tebow and Matt Jones of Arkansas. He ranks fourth in SEC history with 107 total touchdowns responsible for (passing, rushing, and receiving) and fifth in total yards (rushing and passing) with 11,153. His streak of 288 consecutive pass attempts without an interception is the longest in school history and third-longest in SEC history. In the Bulldogs' 2015 game against the Arkansas, he set the school single game record and tied the SEC single game record for touchdowns responsible for with seven (five passing two rushing) and set a new school record for touchdown passes in a single game. He was named the AutoNation National Offensive Player of the Week by the Football Writers Association of America, the Davey O'Brien Award National Quarterback of the Week, a Manning Award Star of the Week by the Allstate Sugar Bowl, and the SEC offensive player of the week following his performance in the Bulldogs' victory over Kentucky, a game in which he passed for 348 yards and three touchdowns and rushed for 117 yards and three touchdowns. The six touchdowns in a single contest tied the school record set by Jackie Parker in 1952 and Prescott became the first player in school history to throw for over 300 yards and rush for over 100 yards in the same game. This was the fourth time that he has been named SEC Offensive Player of the Week, the most in program history. Prescott received further national recognition by being placed on several national award watch lists including being named a finalist for the Johnny Unitas Golden Arm Award, a semifinalist for both the Maxwell Award and the Davey O'Brien Award, placed on the watch list for the Walter Camp Player of the Year Award, the Manning Award, the Wuerffel Trophy, and the Senior Bowl, and won the Senior CLASS Award as well as being awarded the 2017 NCAA Today's Top 10 Award. For the season he passed for 3,793 yards, 29 passing touchdowns and 10 rushing touchdowns.

For his career, Prescott finished third in SEC history in total yards, and fourth in total touchdowns. He holds 38 school records.

College statistics

Records and honors
 Single game record for passing yards in the Orange Bowl (453)
 Single game record for passing attempts in the Orange Bowl (51, tied)
 Single game record for passing completions in the Orange Bowl (33, tied)
 Single game record for passing yards in the Belk Bowl (380)
 Single game record for total yards in the Belk Bowl (427)
 Single game record for touchdown passes in the Belk Bowl with (4, tied) 
 2016 Senior Bowl Most Outstanding Player
2015 Senior Class Award
2014 and 2015 Conerly Trophy
2015 Belk Bowl MVP
2013, 2014, and 2015 SEC Fall Academic Honor Roll
2015 SEC Offensive Player of the Week (at Arkansas and vs. Kentucky)
2014 and 2015 First-team All-SEC (AP and Coaches)
2014 SEC Offensive Player of Week (at LSU, vs. Auburn, and vs. Vanderbilt)
2013 Liberty Bowl MVP

Professional career

The Dallas Cowboys entered the 2016 NFL Draft with a plan to acquire a young quarterback to develop behind Tony Romo. After failing to trade up to select Paxton Lynch and Connor Cook, they selected Prescott in the fourth round (135th overall). He was signed to a four-year deal.

2016 season

When Prescott joined the Dallas Cowboys for their rookie mini camp, he was issued #10 since veteran wide receiver Devin Street wore his college number 15. During the first week of rookie mini camp, he decided to switch to #4 in honor of his mother, whose birthday is on September 4. He is the first Dallas Cowboys quarterback in history to wear #4.

The rookie moved up on the depth chart when backup quarterback Kellen Moore broke his right tibia during the first week of training camp and after the Cowboys could not reach an agreement with the Cleveland Browns to trade for backup Josh McCown.

After Moore's injury, Prescott competed with second-year quarterback Jameill Showers for the backup job to established starter Tony Romo. Several reports from August training camp indicated that Showers outperformed Prescott, showing greater accuracy and a quicker release. However, the Cowboys coaching staff made the decision to start Prescott in the team's preseason opener at the Los Angeles Rams. Working with the Cowboys' first-team offense, Prescott completed 10 of 12 passes for 139 yards and two touchdowns in one half of action, though Dallas would lose the game 28–24. Prescott continued his hot streak throughout the rest of the preseason, impressing all with his veteran-like pocket poise and decision making.

After starting quarterback Tony Romo suffered a vertebral compression fracture during the first quarter of the Cowboys' Week 3 preseason game against the Seattle Seahawks, and in light of Romo's projected 8–10 week recovery time, Prescott was named the Cowboys starter for the beginning of the 2016 season.

Prescott's first regular-season start came on September 11 at home against the New York Giants, becoming the fourth rookie quarterback to open the season as a starter in franchise history, and the first rookie to start at quarterback for the Cowboys since Quincy Carter in 2001. He totaled 227 passing yards, as the Cowboys lost, 20–19. During Week 2 against the Washington Redskins, Prescott had 292 passing yards and a rushing touchdown as the Cowboys won, 27–23. Prescott threw his first NFL touchdown, a 17-yarder to wide receiver Dez Bryant, during the Cowboys' Week 3 matchup against the Chicago Bears. In total, he threw for 248 yards, the one touchdown, and also had a rushing score. The Cowboys won 31–17. In Week 4 at the San Francisco 49ers, Prescott passed for two touchdowns and 245 yards as the Cowboys won, 24–17. Against the Cincinnati Bengals in Week 5, Prescott threw for 227 yards and a touchdown while rushing for a touchdown in a 28–14 Cowboys victory. During Week 6 against the Green Bay Packers, Prescott had three touchdowns and 247 passing yards as the Cowboys won 30–16. The game marked the end of Prescott's interception-free streak.  After a bye week, the Cowboys faced off against the Philadelphia Eagles in Week 8, and fellow rookie quarterback Carson Wentz for their first career matchup. The Cowboys prevailed in overtime 29–23, with Prescott totaling three touchdowns (two passing and one rushing) on 287 passing yards.

Week 9 saw the Cowboys beat the Cleveland Browns 35–10, with Prescott providing 247 passing yards and three touchdowns. In Week 10 against the Pittsburgh Steelers, the Cowboys won 35–30, with Prescott passing for 319 yards and three touchdowns. One of the touchdowns was a then-career-high 83-yarder to Ezekiel Elliott. The Cowboys continued their win streak in Week 11 by beating the Baltimore Ravens 27–17 with Prescott throwing for 301 yards and three touchdowns. Week 12's annual Thanksgiving game provided a 31–26 win over the Washington Redskins in their second divisional matchup. Prescott had two touchdowns (one rushing and one passing) and 195 passing yards. His outstanding performance in November earned him Offensive Rookie of the Month.

During Week 13 against the Minnesota Vikings, the Cowboys won 17–15, with Prescott passing for 139 yards and one touchdown. In Week 14, the Cowboys were dealt their second loss on the season, by a score of 10–7, from division rival New York Giants, with Prescott passing for 169 yards and one touchdown in the contest. In Week 15, the Cowboys beat the Tampa Bay Buccaneers 26–20, with Prescott providing 279 passing yards and one rushing touchdown. Against the Detroit Lions in Week 16, the Cowboys won 42–21. Prescott passed for 212 yards and three touchdowns. In the Week 17 regular season finale, with the top playoff seed in the NFC clinched, the Cowboys decided to rest several starters. They lost to the Philadelphia Eagles 27–13, with Prescott only attempting eight passes for a total of 37 yards before being benched. As a rookie, Prescott started all 16 games with 3,667 passing yards, 282 rushing yards, 29 total touchdowns, and only four interceptions, and his 67.8% completion percentage ranked fourth among NFL quarterbacks in 2016.

With the Cowboys finishing the season with a 13–3 record, the team clinched the NFC East title. In the Divisional Round, the Cowboys faced the Green Bay Packers. Prescott completed 24 of 38 for 302 yards, with a quarterback rating of 103.2, and three touchdowns and an interception. Despite his strong performance, the Cowboys lost 34–31, ending their season. After a spectacular rookie season, Prescott was selected to the Pro Bowl and named the NFL Offensive Rookie of the Year, receiving 28 of 50 votes, beating out running back and teammate Ezekiel Elliott by 7 votes. He finished sixth in MVP voting. He was ranked 14th by his peers on the NFL Top 100 Players of 2017. He was named to the PFWA All-Rookie Team, becoming the second Cowboys quarterback to receive this award, joining Troy Aikman in 1989.

2017 season

Prescott started his second professional season with 268 passing yards and a touchdown in the 19–3 victory over the New York Giants on Sunday Night Football. He followed that up with his first setback of the season with a 42–17 loss to the Denver Broncos, where he was 30-of-50 for 238 passing yards, two touchdowns, and two interceptions. In the next game against the Arizona Cardinals on Monday Night Football, he bounced back with 183 passing yards, two passing touchdowns, and his first rushing touchdown of the season in the primetime 28–17 win. In Week 4, against the Los Angeles Rams, he was 20-of-36 for 252 yards, three passing touchdowns, and one interception in the 35–30 defeat. In the next game against the Green Bay Packers, he posted similar results, going 25-of-36 for 251 passing yards, three touchdowns, one rushing touchdown, and one interception in the 35–31 loss. The Cowboys snapped their small losing streak in the next game against the San Francisco 49ers, posting a 40–10 victory. In the game, Prescott had his third consecutive game with three touchdown passes. Prescott and the Cowboys followed up the big win over San Francisco with two victories over the Washington Redskins and Kansas City Chiefs to put the team at a 5–3 record.

Going into the next game against the Atlanta Falcons, the Cowboys learned that they would be without running back Ezekiel Elliott for a six-game suspension, putting more pressure on Prescott for the success of the offense. In the game against the Falcons, Prescott was 20-of-30 for 176 yards and had a rushing touchdown, but was sacked 8 times as the Cowboys fell 27–7. In the next game against the Philadelphia Eagles, he went 18-of-31 for 145 yards and three interceptions in the 37–9 loss. The Cowboys' struggles on offense continued in the next game against the Los Angeles Chargers on Thanksgiving. The Cowboys fell 28–6 as Prescott tallied 179 passing yards and two interceptions. Despite the setbacks, the Cowboys remained alive in playoff contention and responded with a 38–14 win over the Washington Redskins, where Prescott threw for two touchdowns. In the next game against the New York Giants, he was 20-of-30 for a season-high 332 yards and three passing touchdowns, including an 81-yarder to Rod Smith, in the 30–10 victory. Prescott had a rushing touchdown in the next game as the Cowboys prevailed 20–17 over the Oakland Raiders. In a pivotal Week 16 matchup with the Seattle Seahawks on Christmas Eve, he recorded 181 passing yards but had two interceptions in the costly 21–12 loss, which eliminated the Cowboys from postseason contention. However, even if the Cowboys won out, they would have still missed the playoffs due to the Atlanta Falcons finishing 10–6 (thus owning the tiebreaker). Prescott finished the season with 179 passing yards and a touchdown in the 6–0 victory over the Philadelphia Eagles in Week 17. Overall, Prescott finished his second professional season with 3,324 passing yards, 22 passing touchdowns, 13 interceptions, 357 rushing yards, and six rushing touchdowns.

2018 season

Prescott started his third professional season passing for 170 yards in a 16–8 loss to the Carolina Panthers. In the next game, he helped lead the Cowboys to their first win of the 2018 season with 160 passing yards and a touchdown against the New York Giants. After a loss to the Seattle Seahawks in Week 3, Prescott passed for 255 yards and two touchdowns in a 26–24 victory over the Detroit Lions. In Week 5, against the Houston Texans on Sunday Night Football, he passed for 208 yards, one touchdown, and two interceptions in the 19–16 overtime road loss. In Week 6, a 40–7 victory over the Jacksonville Jaguars, he had 183 passing yards and two passing touchdowns along with 11 carries for 82 rushing yards and a rushing touchdown. After losses to the Washington Redskins and Tennessee Titans, he helped lead the Cowboys to a 27–20 road victory over the Philadelphia Eagles with 270 passing yards and a touchdown along with nine rushing yards and a touchdown. In that stretch, the Cowboys acquired Amari Cooper from the Oakland Raiders as a new receiving target for Prescott. After leading a game-winning drive over the Atlanta Falcons in Week 11, he helped lead the Cowboys to a 31–23 victory over the Washington Redskins on Thanksgiving. In the victory, he had 289 passing yards, two passing touchdowns, and his third consecutive game with a rushing touchdown. One of his passing touchdowns was a career-high 90-yard touchdown pass to Cooper. In Week 13, Prescott passed for 248 yards and one passing touchdown and rushed for 22 yards as the Cowboys defeated the 10–1 New Orleans Saints by a score of 13–10. In the next game against the Eagles, Prescott was held to 222 with two interceptions through three quarters, but exploded for 270 yards and three touchdowns to Cooper in the fourth quarter and overtime, ending with a career-high 455 yards, a 104.9 passer rating, and a franchise-record 42 completions in the 29–23 victory. The 42 completions were the most for any quarterback in a single game in the 2018 regular season. After a Week 15 shutout loss to the Indianapolis Colts, Prescott rebounded with 161 passing yards, one passing touchdown, and one rushing touchdown in Week 16 against the Tampa Bay Buccaneers. After the win, the Dallas Cowboys won the NFC East for the second time in three years. In the regular season finale against the New York Giants, Prescott threw for 387 passing yards, and four passing touchdowns in the 36–35 win, making the Cowboys finish 2018 with a 10–6 record.

The Cowboys entered the playoffs as the fourth seed. They faced off against the Seahawks in the Wild Card Round, which at the time, Prescott was 0–2 against them. He passed for 226 yards, a touchdown, and an interception along with 29 rushing yards and a crucial touchdown late in the fourth quarter of the 24–22 victory to earn his first playoff victory. In the Divisional Round against the Los Angeles Rams, he passed for 266 yards and a touchdown and rushed for three yards and a touchdown as the Cowboys fell 30–22. Prescott earned his second Pro Bowl selection as an alternate, replacing Drew Brees, where he threw a touchdown pass to Austin Hooper for the NFC side's only points of the game as the team lost to the AFC side 7–26.

2019 season

In the season-opener against the New York Giants, Prescott threw 25 times for 405 yards and four touchdowns in the 35–17 win. Prescott's performance in the game gave him a perfect passer rating, the first Dallas quarterback to achieve the feat since Craig Morton on October 5, 1969. Prescott was named the NFC Offensive Player of the Week for his performance in Week 1. During Week 5 against the Green Bay Packers, Prescott finished with 463 passing yards, two touchdowns, and three interceptions as the Cowboys lost 24–34. During Week 9 against the Giants on Monday Night Football, Prescott's first pass attempt was intercepted by Antoine Bethea. Afterwards, he threw for 257 yards and three touchdowns in the 37–18 road victory. In Week 10 against the Minnesota Vikings on NBC Sunday Night Football, Prescott threw for 397 yards, three touchdowns, and one interception in the 28–24 loss. During Week 11 against the Detroit Lions, Prescott finished with 444 passing yards, 28 rushing yards, and four total touchdowns in the 35–27 road victory.  For his efforts, Prescott was named the NFC Offensive Player of the Week for the second time in 2019. In Week 17 against the Redskins, Prescott threw for 303 yards and four touchdowns and rushed for 35 yards during the 47–16 win. Prescott finished the season with 4,902 passing yards, which ranked second in the league, 30 touchdowns, which ranked fourth, and 11 interceptions. In addition, he recorded 52 carries for 277 rushing yards and three rushing touchdowns as the Cowboys missed the playoffs with an 8–8 record. He was ranked 46th by his fellow players on the NFL Top 100 Players of 2020.

2020 season

The Cowboys placed the franchise tag on Prescott on March 16, 2020, worth $31.4 million for the 2020 season. He signed the tender on June 22, 2020.
In Week 1 against the Los Angeles Rams on NBC Sunday Night Football, Prescott threw for 266 yards and a touchdown and rushed for 30 yards as the Cowboys lost 20–17. 
In Week 2 against the Atlanta Falcons, Prescott threw for 450 passing yards and a touchdown, and rushed for three additional touchdowns to help the Cowboys win 40–39.  At one point during the game, the Falcons had a twenty-point lead over the Cowboys, but Prescott's four second half touchdowns aided by a successful onside kick and a last-second field goal won the game for the Cowboys. He became the first player in NFL history to pass for at least 400 yards and rush for three touchdowns in the same game.
Prescott was named the NFC Offensive Player of the Week for his performance in Week 2. During Week 3 against the Seattle Seahawks, Prescott finished with 472 passing yards, three touchdowns, and two interceptions as the Cowboys lost 38–31. During Week 4 against the Cleveland Browns, Prescott finished with 502 passing yards, four touchdowns, an interception, and a lost fumble as the Cowboys lost 49–38. He became the first player in NFL history to pass for at least 450 yards in three consecutive games.

In Week 5 against the New York Giants, Prescott suffered an injury to his right ankle, and was carted off the field. He completed 14 passes for 166 yards and an interception plus had a receiving touchdown before leaving. It was revealed that he had suffered a compound fracture and dislocation to his right ankle, and he underwent surgery the same night, ending his season. Prescott was placed on season-ending injured reserve on October 19, 2020.

2021 season

The Cowboys placed the exclusive franchise tag on Prescott for the second consecutive season on March 9, 2021, and he signed a four-year contract extension with the Cowboys the next day for $160 million with $126 million guaranteed. The deal included a $66 million signing bonus, the highest in NFL history. In June 2021, he left Adidas and signed a five-year deal with Jordan. In his first game back from his injury in Week 1 against the Tampa Bay Buccaneers, Prescott threw for 403 yards, three touchdowns, and an interception in a 31–29 loss. In Week 6, Prescott threw for 445 yards, three touchdowns, and one interception in a 35–29 overtime win over the New England Patriots. His performance earned him NFC Offensive Player Of The Week. In Week 16, Prescott threw four touchdowns in a 56–14 blowout win against the Washington Football Team as the Cowboys would go on to clinch the NFC East division title. For his performance against the Football Team, Prescott earned another NFC Offensive Player of the Week. In Week 18, Prescott threw for 295 yards and five touchdowns in a 51–26 win over the Eagles, earning NFC Offensive Player of the Week.

As the division winner, the Cowboys hosted the San Francisco 49ers in the Wild Card Round. In the game, Prescott completed 23 of 43 passing attempts for 254 yards with one touchdown and one interception, and also rushed for 27 yards and an additional touchdown in the 23–17 loss. On the last play with 14 seconds left, Prescott ran a quarterback draw up the middle for 17 yards, and was unable to spike the ball to stop the clock from running down. Despite the loss, Prescott was named NVP (Nickelodeon Valuable Player) with more than 81 percent of the online vote, becoming the second losing quarterback to do so in as many years. Prescott later apologized for comments which appeared to condone fans throwing objects at the officiating crew after the game ended.

2022 season

In Week 1 against the Tampa Bay Buccaneers, Prescott struggled, completing 14 of 29 passes for 134 yards and an interception before leaving the game in the fourth quarter with a right thumb injury in the 19–3 loss. Later, it was announced Prescott will miss 6-8 weeks with the thumb injury. Prescott returned in Week 7 against the Detroit Lions, where he threw 207 yards and a touchdown in the 24–6 win. Prescott finished the season with 2,860 passing yards, 66.2% passing completion, 23 touchdowns, and a season-high of 15 interceptions.

In the Wild Card round, Prescott completed 25 of 33 passes for 305 yards, 4 passing touchdowns, and rushed for a touchdown as the Cowboys would beat the Buccaneers 31−14. 

In the Divisional round, Prescott threw for 206 yards and 1 touchdown but threw 2 interceptions as the Cowboys would lose 12−19 against the 49ers.

NFL career statistics

Regular season

Postseason

Career highlights and awards
 NFL Rookie of the Year (2016)
 Walter Payton Man of the Year (2022) 
 Offensive Rookie of the Month – November 2016
 Pepsi NFL Rookie of the Year winner (2016)
 5× Pepsi NFL Rookie of the Week
 2× Pro Bowl (2016, 2018)
 2× FedEx Air Player of the Week (2018)
 4× NFC Offensive Player of the Week (Week 1, 2019, Week 11, 2019, Week 2, 2020, Week 6, 2021)

NFL records
In Week 6 of the 2016 season, Prescott, with 176 attempts, broke the record for most consecutive pass attempts without an interception to start a career—a record previously held by Tom Brady at 162 attempts in 2000–2001. This is also the record for consecutive attempts without an interception by a rookie, having broken the record set by Carson Wentz at 134 earlier in 2016. Wentz and Prescott had been exchanging the rookie record after having broken the Chad Hutchinson record of 95 set in 2002.

Prescott finished his 2016 rookie regular season with a record 11 games with an over 100 NFL passer rating, breaking the rookie record of nine games set by Russell Wilson in 2012. He tied the Ben Roethlisberger 2004 rookie record of winning 13 games as a starter.
His NFL passer rating of 104.9 broke Robert Griffin III's rookie record of 102.4 set in 2012. His 0.87% interception to attempts (459–4) broke the rookie record of 1.27% (393–5) set by Robert Griffin III. He threw 23 touchdowns and 4 interceptions for a touchdown to interception ratio of 5.75 breaking the previous rookie record of 4.00 (20 touchdowns and 5 interceptions) set by Robert Griffin III, and for a touchdown to interception differential of 19 breaking Russell Wilson's rookie record of 16 (26 touchdowns and 10 interceptions). His 67.76% pass completion percentage broke the rookie record of 66.44% set by Ben Roethlisberger. In a game against the Tampa Bay Buccaneers on December 18, 2016, Prescott, with an 88.9% completion percentage, broke the rookie single game record of 87.0% set by Mike Glennon in 2013.

Cowboys franchise records

 Most Completions (game): 42 (December 9, 2018, against the Philadelphia Eagles)
 Most Completions (rookie season): 311 (2016)
 Most Completions (game, as a rookie): 32 (December 18, 2016, against the Tampa Bay Buccaneers)
 Most Pass Attempts (rookie season): 459 (2016)
 Most Passing Yards (rookie season): 3,667 (2016)
 Most Passing Touchdowns (season): 37 (2021)
 Most Passing Touchdowns (rookie season): 23 (2016)
 Best Passer Rating (rookie season): 104.9 (2016)
 Best Passer Rating (game, as a rookie): 148.3 (December 16, 2016, against the Detroit Lions)
 Most Yds/Pass Att (rookie season): 7.99 (2016)
 Most Pass Yds/Game (career): 257.1
Most Pass Yds/Game (season): 306.4 (2019)
 Most Pass Yds/Game (rookie season): 229.2 (2016)
 Most 300+ yard passing games (rookie season): 3
Completion Percentage (career): 66.6%
Interception Percentage: (career: minimum 16 starts): 2.0%
Interception Percentage: (season/rookie season): 0.9% (2016)
Most sacks taken: (season) 56 (2018)
Most 4th Quarter Comebacks (rookie season): 5 (2016)
Most 4th Quarter Comebacks (season): 5 (2016, tied with Tony Romo in 2012)

Personal life
Prescott is a Christian. He is the son of Nathaniel and Peggy Prescott and has two older brothers, Tad and Jace, an older sister, Natalie Prescott-Smith, and an older half-brother, Elliott Prescott, from his father's previous marriage. Jace was an offensive lineman at Northwestern State. His mother died of colon cancer in November 2013. The Faith Fight Finish Foundation by Dak Prescott has been established in her honor, which helps people deal with adversity. His older brother Jace committed suicide in April 2020. His father is African American and his late mother was European American. Prescott currently resides in Frisco, Texas.

See also
 Mississippi State Bulldogs football statistical leaders
 List of National Football League records (individual)

References

External links

 Dallas Cowboys bio
 Mississippi State Bulldogs bio

1993 births
African-American players of American football
American football quarterbacks
Dallas Cowboys players
Living people
Mississippi State Bulldogs football players
National Conference Pro Bowl players
People from Haughton, Louisiana
People from Sulphur, Louisiana
Players of American football from Louisiana
21st-century African-American sportspeople
National Football League Offensive Rookie of the Year Award winners
Ed Block Courage Award recipients